Francis Chamberlayne (after 1667–1728), of Stoneythorpe, Warwickshire and London, was an English politician who sat in the House of Commons between 1713 and 1728.

Chamberlayne was the son of Francis Chamberlayne, a London grocer, whom he succeeded in 1695, inheriting Stoney Thorpe Hall (or Stoneythorpe Hall) near Southam, Warwickshire. The Chamberlaynes were originally a Warwickshire family.

Chamberlayn was a Member (MP) of the Parliament of Great Britain for New Shoreham 1713 - 1715 and 11 June 1720 – 26 September 1728.

Chamberlayn died unmarried. in 1728.

References

17th-century births
1728 deaths
People from Warwickshire
Members of the Parliament of Great Britain for English constituencies
British MPs 1713–1715
British MPs 1715–1722
British MPs 1722–1727
British MPs 1727–1734